Hans-Jürgen "Hansi" Kreische (born 19 July 1947) is a former East German footballer.

Career

Club career
Kreische spent his entire career with his hometown club, Dynamo Dresden, scoring 127 goals in 234 DDR-Oberliga games between 1964 and 1978. He was East Germany's top scorer in 1971, 1972, 1973 and 1976, and was player of the year in 1973.

International career
Kreische was an East German international, scoring 25 goals in 50 appearances. He was part of the 1974 World Cup squad, and was also in the 1972 Olympic bronze medal winning team. He and Heino Kleiminger were the only players to score four goals in one match for East Germany. Kreische was not selected for the 1976 Olympic team that went on to win gold after he was blacklisted by the Stasi for undertaking a private bet with the West German politician Hans Apel during the 1974 World Cup.

After football
Following his retirement from football, Kreische worked as a coach with Dynamo's youth system and had a brief spell as first-team manager, during the 1995–96 season.
As of April 2010, he is working as a successful scout for RB Leipzig.

Honours
 DDR-Oberliga (5): 1971, 1973, 1976, 1977, 1978
 FDGB Pokal (2): 1971, 1977
 Olympic Bronze Medal: 1972

References

External links
 Career statistics
 International career
 

1947 births
Living people
1974 FIFA World Cup players
Dynamo Dresden managers
Dresdner SC managers
Dynamo Dresden players
East German footballers
East Germany international footballers
Association football forwards
Footballers at the 1972 Summer Olympics
German footballers
Olympic bronze medalists for East Germany
Olympic footballers of East Germany
Footballers from Dresden
Dynamo Dresden non-playing staff
Olympic medalists in football
DDR-Oberliga players
Medalists at the 1972 Summer Olympics
German football managers